Gilda Susan Radner (June 28, 1946 – May 20, 1989) was an American actress, comedian, writer, and singer. Radner was one of the seven original cast members of the "Not Ready For Prime Time Players" on the NBC sketch comedy series Saturday Night Live from its inception in 1975 until her departure in 1980. In her routines on SNL, she specialized in parodies of television stereotypes, such as advice specialists and news anchors. In 1978, Radner won an Emmy Award for her performances on the show. She also portrayed those characters in her highly successful one-woman show on Broadway in 1979. Radner's SNL work established her as an iconic figure in the history of American comedy.

She died from ovarian cancer in 1989. Her autobiography dealt frankly with her life, work, and personal struggles, including her struggles with that illness. Her widower, Gene Wilder, carried out her wish that information about her illness would be used to help other cancer victims, founding—and inspiring the founding of—organizations that emphasize early diagnosis, attention to hereditary factors and support for cancer patients. Posthumously, Radner won a Grammy Award in 1990, was inducted into the Michigan Women's Hall of Fame in 1992, and received a star on the Hollywood Walk of Fame in 2003.

Early life
Radner was born in Detroit, Michigan, to Jewish parents, Henrietta (née Dworkin), a legal secretary, and Herman Radner, a businessman.  In Radner's autobiography she stated, “I was named after my grandmother whose name began with G, but 'Gilda' came directly from the movie with Glenn Ford and Rita Hayworth.”  Through her mother, Radner was a second cousin of business executive Steve Ballmer. She grew up in Detroit with a nanny, Elizabeth Clementine Gillies, whom she called "Dibby" (and on whom she based her famous character Emily Litella), and an older brother, Michael. She attended the exclusive University Liggett School in Detroit.

Toward the end of her life, Radner wrote in her autobiography, It's Always Something, that during her childhood and young adulthood she had battled numerous eating disorders: "I coped with stress by having every possible eating disorder from the time I was nine years old. I have weighed as much as 160 pounds and as little as 93. When I was a kid, I overate constantly. My weight distressed my mother and she took me to a doctor who put me on Dexedrine diet pills when I was ten years old."

Radner was close to her father, who operated Detroit's Seville Hotel, where many nightclub performers and actors stayed while performing in the city. He took her on trips to New York to see Broadway shows. As Radner wrote in It's Always Something, when she was 12, her father developed a brain tumor. The first symptoms came on suddenly: he told people that his glasses were too tight. Within days, he was bedridden and unable to communicate, and remained in that condition until his death two years later.

In 1964, Radner graduated from Liggett and enrolled at the University of Michigan at Ann Arbor, where she planned to get a degree in education.

Career
In her senior year at the University of Michigan, Radner dropped out to follow her boyfriend, Canadian sculptor Jeffrey Rubinoff, to Toronto. There, she made her professional acting debut in the 1972 production of Godspell, with future stars Eugene Levy, Andrea Martin, Victor Garber, Martin Short, and Paul Shaffer. Afterward, Radner joined The Second City comedy troupe in Toronto.

From 1974 to 1975, Radner was a featured player on the National Lampoon Radio Hour, a comedy program syndicated to some 600 U.S. radio stations. Fellow cast members included John Belushi, Chevy Chase, Richard Belzer, Bill Murray, Brian Doyle-Murray, and Rhonda Coullet.

Saturday Night Live
Radner gained wide recognition in 1975, as one of the original "Not Ready for Prime Time Players", the freshman cast of the first season of Saturday Night Live. She was the first performer to be cast in the show, co-wrote much of the material that she performed, and collaborated with Alan Zweibel (of the show's writing staff) on the development of sketches that featured her recurring characters. Between 1975 and 1980, she created many characters, such as the obnoxious personal advice expert Roseanne Roseannadanna (modeled after a New York reporter, Rose Ann Scamardella), and "Baba Wawa", a parody of Barbara Walters. After Radner's death, Walters noted in an interview that Radner had been the "first person to make fun of news anchors, now it's done all the time."

Another of Radner’s invented characters was Emily Litella, an elderly, hearing-impaired editorialist who made irate, misinformed comments in interview sketches on SNL’s recurring Weekend Update segment. Radner also parodied celebrities such as Lucille Ball, Patti Smith, and Olga Korbut in SNL sketches. In 1978, she won an Emmy Award for her work on SNL. In Rolling Stones February 2015 appraisal of all 141 SNL cast members to date, Radner was ranked ninth in importance. "[Radner was] the most beloved of the original cast," they wrote. "In the years between Mary Tyler Moore and Seinfeld's Elaine, Radner was the prototype for the brainy city girl with a bundle of neuroses."

Radner battled bulimia while on the show. She had a relationship with fellow SNL and National Lampoon castmate Bill Murray, which reportedly ended badly, though few details of their relationship or its end were made public. In her autobiography, Radner mentioned Murray only once, and in passing: "All the guys [in the National Lampoon group of writers and performers] liked to have me around because I would laugh at them till I peed in my pants and tears rolled out of my eyes. We worked together for a couple of years creating The National Lampoon Show, writing The National Lampoon Radio Hour, and even working on stuff for the magazine. Bill Murray joined the show and Richard Belzer ..."

Alan Zweibel, who co-created the Roseanne Roseannadanna character and co-wrote Roseanne's dialogue, recalled that Radner, one of only three original SNL cast members who stayed away from cocaine, chastised him for abusing it.

In 1979, the new president and CEO of NBC, Fred Silverman, offered Radner her own primetime variety show, but she turned down the offer. That same year, she was a host of the Music for UNICEF Concert at the United Nations General Assembly. Radner also gave the commencement address, in character as Roseanne Roseannadanna, to the 1979 graduating class at the Columbia School of Journalism.

Radner reportedly expressed mixed emotions about being recognized and approached in public by fans and other strangers. SNL historians Doug Hill and Jeff Weingrad said she variously became "angry when she was approached, and upset when she wasn't".

Work in theater, a record album and her first movie
In 1979, Radner appeared on Broadway in a successful one-woman show, Gilda Radner – Live from New York. The show featured material that was racier than NBC censors would allow on Saturday Night Live, such as the song "Let's Talk Dirty to the Animals". The same year, shortly before Radner's final season on Saturday Night Live, her Broadway show was filmed by Mike Nichols and released with the title Gilda Live. It co-starred Paul Shaffer and Don Novello, and screened in theaters nationwide in 1980, but was a box-office flop. A soundtrack album was also commercially unsuccessful. During the Broadway production, Radner met her first husband, G. E. Smith, a musician who worked on the show. They were married in a civil ceremony in 1980.

In the fall of 1980, after the departure of all the original SNL cast members from the show, Radner began appearing, with fellow actor Sam Waterston, in the Jean Kerr play Lunch Hour. They played two people whose spouses are having an affair, and who, in retaliation, begin an affair of their own consisting of lunch-hour trysts. The show ran for more than seven months, playing in various US theaters, including the John F. Kennedy Center for the Performing Arts in Washington, D.C. Newspaper critics, including Tom Shales, praised both the play and Radner's performance.

Radner's SNL castmate Laraine Newman said in a 2018 interview that she believed Radner's movie career had turned out to be mostly disappointing. This was because, according to Newman, directors and producers did not know how to cast Radner in roles where her talents could best shine. Quoting her interview,"The specific nature of her talent was she did characters, and she would probably have been better served if she had taken part in writing the things that she did," Newman asserts. "But I don't think it occurred to her. If she and Alan Zweibel had collaborated on a feature, it might have been a whole different thing."

Personal life 

After breaking up with Jeffrey Rubinoff, Radner had an on-again-off-again relationship with Martin Short while both were appearing in Godspell.
Radner had romantic involvements with several male Saturday Night Live castmates, including Bill Murray (after a previous relationship with his brother Brian Doyle-Murray) and Dan Aykroyd. Radner's friend Judy Levy recounted Radner saying she found Ghostbusters hard to watch since the cast included so many of her ex-boyfriends: Aykroyd, Murray, and Harold Ramis. Radner was married to musician G. E. Smith from 1980 to 1982; they met while working on Gilda Radner – Live from New York.

Radner met actor Gene Wilder on the set of the Sidney Poitier film Hanky Panky (released in 1982), when the two worked together making the film. She described their first meeting as "love at first sight". After meeting Wilder, her marriage to Smith deteriorated. Radner made a second film with Wilder, The Woman in Red (released in 1984), and their relationship deepened. The two were married on September 18, 1984, in Saint-Tropez. They made a third film together, Haunted Honeymoon, in 1986 and remained married until her death in 1989.

Details of Radner's eating disorder were reported in a book about Saturday Night Live by Doug Hill and Jeff Weingrad, which was published and received much media coverage during a period when Radner was consulting various doctors in Los Angeles about symptoms of an illness she was suffering that turned out to be cancer.

Illness

In 1985, while on the set of Haunted Honeymoon in the United Kingdom, Radner began experiencing severe fatigue, and pain in her upper legs. She sought medical treatment, and for a period of 10 months, various doctors, most of them in Los Angeles, gave her several diagnoses that all turned out to be wrong; meanwhile, she continued to experience pain.

During those 10 months, she also faced hardships such as the publication of Hill and Weingrad's highly publicized book about Saturday Night Live, which provided many details about her eating disorder as well as the financial failure of Haunted Honeymoon, which had grossed only $8,000,000 in the United States, entering the box-office-returns ranking at number 8, then slipping to 14 the following week. As Radner wrote in It's Always Something:

Finally, on October 21, 1986, Radner was diagnosed with stage IV ovarian cancer. She immediately underwent surgery and had a hysterectomy. On October 26, surgeons removed a grapefruit-size tumor from her abdomen. Radner then began chemotherapy and radiation therapy treatment, as she wrote in It's Always Something, and the treatment caused extreme physical and emotional pain.

After her diagnosis, the National Enquirer ran the headline "Gilda Radner In Life-Death Struggle" in its following issue. Without asking for her comment, the editors of the publication asserted that she was dying. Radner wrote in It's Always Something:

Radner saw her Saturday Night Live castmates one last time at Laraine Newman's 36th birthday party (in March 1988). According to Bill Murray, when he heard she was about to leave the party, he and Dan Aykroyd carried her around the Los Angeles house where the party was held so that she could say goodbye to everyone.

Remission
After Radner was told that she had gone into remission, she wrote It's Always Something (a catchphrase of her character Roseanne Roseannadanna), which included details of her struggle with the illness. Life did a March 1988 cover story on her illness, titled "Gilda Radner's Answer to Cancer: Healing the Body with Mind and Heart." In a Showtime broadcast on March 18, 1988, Radner guest-starred on It's Garry Shandling's Show, mentioning on-camera that a cancer diagnosis and treatment explained the long hiatus in her entertainment career.

Radner was scheduled to host an episode of Saturday Night Live in the spring of 1988, which would have made her the first female former cast member to host the show, but a writers' strike forced production to shut down before the end of the season.

Relapse, death, and SNL response
In September 1988, after tests showed no signs of cancer, Radner went on a maintenance chemotherapy treatment to prolong her remission, but three months later, in December, she learned the cancer had returned. 

She and Wilder were video-recorded entering the January 28, 1989 ceremony for the 46th annual Golden Globe Awards. The video clip was shown on Entertainment Tonight shortly after she died.

On May 17, 1989, she was admitted to Cedars-Sinai Medical Center in Los Angeles to undergo a CT scan. She was given a sedative and went into a coma during the scan. She did not regain consciousness and died three days later, on May 20, 1989; Wilder was at her side. The cause of death was ovarian cancer.

News of Radner's death broke as Steve Martin was rehearsing for his guest-host role on that night's season finale of Saturday Night Live. The show's performers and crew, including Lorne Michaels, Phil Hartman, and Mike Myers (who had, in his own words, "fallen in love" with Radner after playing her son in a BC Hydro commercial on Canadian television and considered her the reason he wanted to be on SNL), had not known how grave her situation was. Martin's planned opening monologue was scrapped; in its place a visibly upset Martin introduced a video clip of a 1978 sketch in which he and Radner had parodied Fred Astaire and Cyd Charisse in the well-known dance routine Dancing In The Dark from The Band Wagon (1953). After the clip, Martin said it reminded him of "how great she was and of how young I looked. Gilda, we miss you." G. E. Smith, Radner's first husband, who was Saturday Night Live’s bandleader, wore a black armband throughout the episode.

Radner was interred at Long Ridge Union Cemetery in Stamford, Connecticut.

Legacy

Wilder established the Gilda Radner Hereditary Cancer Program at Cedars-Sinai to screen high-risk candidates (such as women of Ashkenazi Jewish descent) and to run basic diagnostic tests. He testified before a Congressional committee that Radner's condition had been misdiagnosed and that if doctors had inquired more deeply into her family background they would have learned that her grandmother, aunt, and cousin all died of ovarian cancer, and therefore they might have attacked the disease earlier.

Radner's death helped raise awareness of early detection of ovarian cancer and the connection to familial epidemiology. The media attention in the two years after Radner's death led to registry of 450 families with familial ovarian cancer at the Familial Ovarian Cancer Registry, a research database registry at Roswell Park Comprehensive Cancer Center in Buffalo, New York. The registry was renamed the Gilda Radner Familial Ovarian Cancer Registry (GRFOCR) in 1990 and renamed the Familial Ovarian Cancer Registry in 2013. In 1996, Wilder and Registry founder Steven Piver, one of Radner's medical consultants, published Gilda's Disease: Sharing Personal Experiences and a Medical Perspective on Ovarian Cancer.

In 1991, Gilda's Club, a network of affiliated clubhouses where people living with cancer, their friends, and families, can meet to learn how to live with cancer, was founded by Joanna Bull, Radner's cancer psychotherapist, along with Radner's widower, Gene Wilder (also a cancer survivor) and broadcaster Joel Siegel (who later died after a long battle with cancer). The first club opened in New York City in 1995. The organization took its name from Radner's comment that cancer gave her "membership to an elite club I'd rather not belong to". Radner's story can be read in her book, It's Always Something.

Many Gilda's Clubs have opened across the United States and in Canada. In July 2009, Gilda's Club Worldwide merged with The Wellness Community, another established cancer support organization, to become the Cancer Support Community (CSC). As of 2012, more than 20 local affiliates of Gilda's Club were active. Although some local affiliates of Gilda's Club and The Wellness Community have retained their names, many affiliates have adopted the name Cancer Support Community following the merger.

In 2002, ABC dedicated a three-hour block of programming to Radner. The evening kicked off with a one-hour special, "Gilda Radner's Greatest Moments." Hosted by Saturday Night Live alumnus Molly Shannon, the special featured highlights from her career and appearances by friends and co-stars Victor Garber, Kermit the Frog, Eugene Levy, Steve Martin, Paul Shaffer, Lily Tomlin and Barbara Walters. It was followed by a television movie about her life: Gilda Radner: It's Always Something, starring Jami Gertz as Radner.

In 2007, Radner was featured in Making Trouble, a film tribute to female Jewish comedians, produced by the Jewish Women's Archive. Radner made two comic book appearances: DC Comics Young Love #122 in 1976 and Marvel Team-Up #74 from 1978.

Awards and honors
Radner won an Emmy Award for "Outstanding Continuing or Single Performance by a Supporting Actress in Variety or Music" for her performance on Saturday Night Live in 1977. She posthumously won a Grammy Award for "Best Spoken Word Or Non-Musical Recording" in 1990.

In 1992, Radner was inducted into the Michigan Women's Hall of Fame for her achievements in arts and entertainment. Through the generosity of many who participated in the 2002 ABC special, "Gilda Radner's Greatest Moments," including Lynda Carter, Victor Garber, Eric Idle, David Letterman, Eugene Levy, Peter Mann, Steve Martin, Mike Myers, Paul Shaffer, Lily Tomlin and The Jim Henson Company, producer/actor James Tumminia spearheaded a campaign to dedicate a posthumous star on the Hollywood Walk of Fame to Gilda. On June 27, 2003, Gilda received her star on the Hollywood Walk of Fame at 6801 Hollywood Blvd. Saturday Night Live alumna Molly Shannon (and the host of the ABC special) served as Master of Ceremonies at the induction ceremony at which Laraine Newman, Gilda's Club founder Joanna Bull and Gilda's brother Michael F. Radner appeared to present the honor.

Parts of West Houston Street in New York City, Lombard Street in Toronto, and Chester Avenue in White Plains, New York, have been renamed "Gilda Radner Way". The private road off Kirk Road in Warminster Township, Pennsylvania leading to the Cancer Support Community Greater Philadelphia (formerly Gilda's Club Delaware Valley) is also thus named.

Filmography

Films

Television

Awards

See also
 Friends of Gilda

References

External links
 Cancer Support Community (formerly Gilda's Club)
 Gilda Radner Hereditary Cancer Program
 Gilda Radner Familial Ovarian Cancer Registry
 
 
 Jewish Women in Comedy – Gilda Radner
 

1946 births
1989 deaths
American women comedians
American film actresses
Jewish American actresses
American musical theatre actresses
American stage actresses
American television actresses
American voice actresses
Audiobook narrators
Deaths from cancer in California
Deaths from ovarian cancer
Primetime Emmy Award winners
Grammy Award winners
Jewish American female comedians
Actresses from Detroit
University of Michigan School of Education alumni
20th-century American actresses
American sketch comedians
20th-century American singers
Burials in Connecticut
20th-century American women singers
20th-century American comedians
20th-century American Jews